Thomas D. Terry, S.J. was appointed Santa Clara University's 25th president after the presidency of Patrick A. Donahoe

References
Gerald McKevitt, S.J. The University of Santa Clara: A History, 1851-1977 (Page 385)
http://www.scu.edu/president/history/past.cfm

1816 births
1897 deaths
19th-century Italian Jesuits
Presidents of Santa Clara University
19th-century American clergy